Kadarius Toney (born January 27, 1999) is an American football wide receiver for the Kansas City Chiefs of the National Football League (NFL). He performs as a rapper under the name Yung Joka. Toney played college football at Florida and was drafted by the New York Giants in the first round of the 2021 NFL Draft.

Early years
Toney was born on January 27, 1999, in Mobile, Alabama. He attended Blount High School in Eight Mile, Alabama, where he was the starting quarterback for the last two years of his high school football career as a dual-threat quarterback.

As a junior, Toney threw for 3,604 yards while rushing for 896 and having 53 touchdowns (37 passing, 16 rushing). He was named Alabama 6A second-team all state selection, was selected to the AL.com Coastal Alabama first-team. As a senior, Toney threw for 2,984 yards while rushing for 894 yards and having 47 touchdowns (32 passing, 15 rushing). He was labeled as Alabama 6A Back of the Year, made the 2016 AL.com Super All-State Team, named Offensive MVP of the 2016 AL.com All-Coastal Alabama team, and played in the Alabama-Mississippi All Star Classic. He finished his high school career with a 20-5 record as a starter.

College career
Toney was a consensus three-star recruit as a versatile athlete.  He received scholarship offers from South Carolina, Georgia Tech, South Alabama, Alabama, and Florida.  Toney eventually chose the Florida Gators. 

During his freshman, sophomore and junior seasons, Toney was a reserve player for the Gators at wide receiver, running back, wildcat quarterback and special teams. As a senior in 2020, however, Toney's production increased dramatically. He led the Gators' potent offense with 70 receptions for 984 yards (14.1 average) while scoring 10 touchdowns. In 11 starts he also contributed as a runner (19 carries, 161 yards, 8.5 yards per carry, one touchdown) and returner (seven kick returns, 155 yards, 22.1 average, 11 punt returns, 139 yards, 12.6 average, one touchdown). The Associated Press voted him second-team All-America as an all-purpose player  while the SEC league coaches voted him first-team all-conference. Toney was also a finalist for the 2020 Paul Hornung Award, given to the most versatile player in college football.

Collegiate statistics

Professional career

New York Giants
Toney was selected by the New York Giants in the first round with the 20th overall pick in the 2021 NFL Draft. He signed a four-year contract worth $13.7 million, on June 4, 2021. Toney was placed on the team's COVID-19 reserve list at the start of training camp. Toney started off slow, having only four receptions through the first three games. In Week 4 against the New Orleans Saints, Toney recorded six catches for 78 yards in the 27–21 overtime win. In Week 5 against the Dallas Cowboys, Toney had the best performance of his young career,  recording 10 catches for 189 yards, breaking Odell Beckham Jr.'s Giants receiving record for a rookie, but was ejected for throwing a punch at Cowboys safety Damontae Kazee during the 44-20 loss. Toney missed four weeks of the season due to an oblique injury. On December 13, 2021, Toney was again placed on reserve/COVID-19 list. Despite appearing in only ten games, Toney finished the season with the second-most receiving yards on the Giants with 420 on 39 receptions.

Toney injured his hamstring in week 2 of the 2022 season. The injury caused him to miss five games for the Giants. Before being traded, he only recorded two receptions for zero yards (one reception was for 2 yards, the other was for –2) and no touchdowns.

Kansas City Chiefs
Toney was traded to the Kansas City Chiefs on October 27, 2022, in exchange for a third and a sixth round pick in the 2023 NFL Draft. In Week 10 against the Jacksonville Jaguars, Toney scored his first NFL touchdown. In the 2022 season, Toney appeared in nine regular season games and recorded 16 receptions for 171 receiving yards and two receiving touchdowns.

In Super Bowl LVII, Toney set an NFL record by recording a 65-yard punt return in the fourth quarter, surpassing Jordan Norwood's record of a 61-yard punt return in Super Bowl 50. Toney caught a fourth quarter touchdown that helped put the Chiefs ahead for the first time all game. The Chiefs defeated the Philadelphia Eagles 38-35.

NFL career statistics

Regular Season

Postseason

Rap career
Toney is also a rapper who goes by the stage name of Yung Joka.

References

External links

Florida Gators bio
New York Giants bio

1999 births
Living people
Players of American football from Alabama
Sportspeople from Mobile, Alabama
American football wide receivers
Florida Gators football players
New York Giants players
Kansas City Chiefs players
People from Mobile County, Alabama
American rappers